Iona was a progressive Celtic Christian rock band from the United Kingdom, which was formed in the late 1980s by lead vocalist Joanne Hogg and multi-instrumentalists David Fitzgerald and Dave Bainbridge. Troy Donockley joined later, playing the uilleann pipes, low whistles, and other instruments.

History
By the time Iona released their first self-titled album in 1990, drummer Terl Bryant, bassist Nick Beggs (formerly the bassist of Kajagoogoo), Fiona Davidson on Celtic harp, Peter Whitfield on strings, Troy Donockley on Uilleann pipes and percussionist Frank van Essen had joined the band. The first album Iona concentrated mostly on the history of the island of Iona, from which the band got its name.

Iona returned in 1992 with The Book of Kells, a concept album with several tracks based on pages from the eponymous book. Terl Bryant took over on drums and percussion for this album after the departure of Frank van Essen. Fitzgerald left the band that year to pursue a degree in music. Beyond These Shores, the band's third album, was released in 1993 and included guest musician Robert Fripp. The album was loosely based on the legendary voyage of St. Brendan to the Americas before Christopher Columbus, but the band did not intend for it to be viewed strictly as a "concept album".

Journey into the Morn followed in 1995, a more accessible and rock-oriented album loosely based on the hymn "Be Thou My Vision", which was performed in Gaelic at the beginning of the album and again near the end. Máire Brennan, lead singer of Celtic and new-age band Clannad, was brought in to help Hogg with the Gaelic pronunciation, and she sang backup vocals.

Two live albums followed in the late 1990s: the double-disc Heaven's Bright Sun and Woven Cord, which was performed with the All Souls Orchestra. Terl Bryant departed the band between these two albums, and Frank van Essen returned to fill the vacant spot, playing drums as well as violin, which could be heard on the band's 2000 album, Open Sky.

After being released from their U.S. contract with ForeFront Records and their UK contract with Alliance Records, Iona formed Open Sky Records to release material independently. The first new release on this label was the 2002 box set The River Flows, which featured their then-out-of-print first three albums (all remastered and several first album tracks even re-recorded), as well as a fourth disc of unreleased tracks and rarities called Dunes. The first three albums have since been re-released individually, with new cover art.

The group were then in semi-hiatus for the better part of a decade. However, 2006 saw the April release of a two-disc live DVD Iona: Live in London, featuring a 5.1 Dolby Digital Surround mix by LA's John Kellogg, and a November release of a new studio album: The Circling Hour.

In June 2009 Troy Donockley announced that he was leaving Iona. A message on his website stated: "I have had a wonderful time with my friends in Iona and am very, very proud of the albums we made together. But, as in all life, things change. After extended periods of no activity we have found ourselves with a very different musical and philosophical direction. We have parted as great friends should, with a sad-happiness and I wish the band all the very best wishes for the future". Donockley is currently a member of punk and folk band the Bad Shepherds. He has also played in Barbara Dickson's band for a number of years and is the band's Musical Director. Currently he is on a world tour with Finnish symphonic metal band Nightwish, with whom he has made many guest appearances both live and on their albums over recent years, before joining them as a full-time member in October 2013. He has been replaced in Iona by piper and woodwind player Martin Nolan.

In June 2010, Iona went to the United States for their first tour there in nine years. On 19 June 2010, they played a very well received concert at NEARfest, a progressive rock festival in Bethlehem, Pennsylvania, and during this show they introduced new songs for a forthcoming album, Another Realm, released in 2011, and their final album to date. After several concerts throughout the U.S. and one in Canada, they ended the tour at Cornerstone Festival, a Christian music festival in Illinois, on 30 June.

On Dec. 11, 2016, the band announced on its Facebook page that it was suspending recording and touring as a group, citing other commitments. "We do not know what will happen in future years, whether we will get together again as Iona," the band said. "The door will remain open, but for the foreseeable future, the next and exciting chapters of our journey will involve other avenues."

Members
First incarnation (June 1989)
 David Fitzgerald – saxophones, flutes, recorder, tin whistle
 Dave Bainbridge – keyboards, electric guitar

Trio (August 1989)
 Joanne Hogg – lead vocals, keyboards
 David Fitzgerald – saxophones, flutes, recorder, tin whistle
 Dave Bainbridge – keyboards, electric guitar

First album (November 1989 – March 1990)
 Joanne Hogg – lead vocals, keyboards
 David Fitzgerald – saxophones, flutes, recorder, tin whistle
 Dave Bainbridge – keyboards, electric guitar
 Terl Bryant – drums
 Tim Harries – bass
 Troy Donockley – pipes, whistles, flutes
 Peter Whitfield – strings

Final members
 Joanne Hogg – lead vocals, keyboards, acoustic guitar
 Dave Bainbridge – lead guitar
 Martin Nolan – pipes, whistles, flutes
 Phil Barker – bass
 Frank van Essen – drums, percussion, violin

Discography

Studio recordings
Iona (1990)
The Book of Kells (1992)
Beyond These Shores (1993)
Journey into the Morn (1996)
Open Sky (2000)
The Circling Hour (2006)
Another Realm (2011)

Live recordings
Heaven's Bright Sun (1997)
Woven Cord (1999 – featuring the All Souls Orchestra)
Live in London (2008)
Edge of the World: Live in Europe (2013)

Collection
Treasures (or The Very Best Treasures) (1996)

Box set
 The River Flows: Anthology (2002 - four-CD box-set)
 The Book of Iona (2020 - seventeen-CD box-set)

Other collaborations
Various Artists - Songs for Luca (2003)
Various Artists - Songs for Luca 2 (2007)

Videography 
Iona, DVD (2004) very early live concert
Live in London, DVD (2006)

References

External links
 
 Band biography

British folk rock groups
Celtic music groups
British Christian musical groups
Musical groups established in 1990
British progressive rock groups
Musical groups disestablished in 2016